The Saint Lawrence Island shrew (Sorex jacksoni) is a species of mammal in the family Soricidae. It is found only on Alaska's St. Lawrence Island.

References

Sorex
Mammals of the United States
Taxonomy articles created by Polbot
Mammals described in 1932
St. Lawrence Island
Endemic fauna of Alaska